Hub-Tones is an album by trumpeter Freddie Hubbard recorded on October 10, 1962, and released on the Blue Note label as BLP 4115 and BST 84115. It contains performances by Hubbard, James Spaulding, Herbie Hancock, Reggie Workman and Clifford Jarvis. The cover artwork was designed by Reid Miles with photography by Francis Wolff.

Track listing
All compositions by Freddie Hubbard except as indicated

"You're My Everything" (Mort Dixon, Harry Warren, and Joe Young) – 6:33
"Prophet Jennings" – 5:31
"Hub-Tones" – 8:24
"Lament for Booker" – 9:39
"For Spee's Sake" – 8:35

Compact Disc bonus tracks
"You're My Everything" (Alternate Take) – 6:30
"Hub-Tones" (Alternate Take) – 8:00
"For Spee's Sake" (Alternate Take) – 7:54

Personnel
Freddie Hubbard – trumpet
James Spaulding – alto saxophone, flute
Herbie Hancock – piano
Reggie Workman – bass
Clifford Jarvis – drums

See also

The concept of the album's cover art was used several times by Blue Note, and has been paid homage by other artists since then, including:

Speakin' My Piece, a 1960 Horace Parlan album, also on Blue Note
Shoutin', a 1963 Don Wilkerson album, also on Blue Note
Shadows in the Night, a 2015 Bob Dylan album

References

1963 albums
Freddie Hubbard albums
Blue Note Records albums
Albums produced by Alfred Lion
Albums recorded at Van Gelder Studio